The eastern mourning skink (Lissolepis coventryi), also known commonly as Coventry's spinytail skink and the swamp skink, is a species of lizard in the family Scincidae. The species is endemic to Australia.

Etymology
The specific name, coventryi, is in honor of Australian herpetologist Albert John Coventry.

Geographic range
L. coventryi is found in the Australian states of South Australia, Victoria, and possibly New South Wales.

Habitat
The preferred natural habitat of L. coventryi is freshwater wetlands such as marshes and swamps.

Description

Reproduction
L. coventryi is viviparous.

References

Further reading
Cogger HG (2014). Reptiles and Amphibians of Australia, Seventh Edition. Clayton, Victoria, Australia: CSIRO Publishing. xxx + 1,033 pp. .
Storr GM (1978). "The genus Egernia (Lacertilia, Scincidae) in Western Australia". Records of the Western Australian Museum 6 (2): 147–187. (Egernia coventryi, new species, pp. 175–177, Plate 1).
Wilson S, Swan G (2013). A Complete Guide to Reptiles of Australia, Fourth Edition. Sydney: New Holland Publishers. 522 pp. .

Skinks of Australia
Endemic fauna of Australia
Taxa named by Glen Milton Storr
Reptiles described in 1978
Lissolepis